Gaber Hafez is an Egyptian weightlifter. He competed in the men's middle heavyweight event at the 1968 Summer Olympics.

References

Year of birth missing (living people)
Living people
Egyptian male weightlifters
Olympic weightlifters of Egypt
Weightlifters at the 1968 Summer Olympics
Sportspeople from Cairo
20th-century Egyptian people